Glen Christian (born c. 1929) is a former Canadian football halfback who played five seasons in the Canadian Football League with the Calgary Stampeders and BC Lions. He was drafted by the San Francisco 49ers in the ninth round of the 1952 NFL Draft. He played college football at the University of Idaho.

References

External links
Just Sports Stats

Living people
Year of birth missing (living people)
American football halfbacks
Canadian football running backs
American players of Canadian football
Idaho Vandals football players
Calgary Stampeders players
BC Lions players
Canadian football people from Calgary